Elbert Mack (born July 14, 1986) is an American football cornerback for the Qingdao Clipper of the China Arena Football League (CAFL). He was signed as an undrafted free agent by the Tampa Bay Buccaneers. He played college football at Troy. He has also played for the New Orleans Saints, Houston Texans and Wichita Force.

College career
Mack finished his college football career at Troy after playing his first two years of college ball at Butler County Community College in Kansas.  In his senior season at Troy, he led the nation in interceptions with 8, and was named a first-team All-Sun Belt selection.

Professional career

Tampa Bay Buccaneers
He was signed as an undrafted free agent by the Tampa Bay Buccaneers following the 2008 NFL Draft.

New Orleans Saints
On June 6, 2012, Mack was signed by the New Orleans Saints to a one-year contract. On December 9, 2012, during a game against the New York Giants, Mack intercepted a pass from Eli Manning early in the first quarter and returned in 73 yards for a touchdown, yet the Saints would lose the game 52-27.

Houston Texans
On July 25, 2013, Mack signed with the Houston Texans but was among final cuts. He was re-signed on October 16, 2013, following a season-ending injury to Danieal Manning. He was released again on October 28, 2014.

Wichita Force
Mack signed with the Wichita Force of Champions Indoor Football for the 2015 season, and returned to the team in 2016.

Qingdao Clipper
Mack was selected by the Qingdao Clipper in the fourth round of the 2017 CAFL Draft.

Music
Mack goes by SkinnyChipYatted. Mack dropped his first LP Moet & White Clouds on July 9th, 2019.

References

External links
 Tampa Bay Buccaneers bio
 

1986 births
Living people
Players of American football from Wichita, Kansas
American football cornerbacks
Butler Grizzlies football players
Troy Trojans football players
Tampa Bay Buccaneers players
New Orleans Saints players
Houston Texans players
Wichita Force players
Qingdao Clipper players
American expatriate sportspeople in China
American expatriate players of American football